Lynn Clark may refer to:

 Lynn G. Clark (born 1956), American professor of botany
 Lynn Schofield Clark, media critic and scholar